Portman Square is a garden square in Marylebone, central London, surrounded by  townhouses. It was specifically for private housing let on long leases having a ground rent by the Portman Estate, which owns the private communal gardens.  It marks the western end of Wigmore Street, which connects it to Cavendish Square to the east.

History

Context and development
It was built between 1765 and 1784 on land belonging to Henry William Portman.

An infantry barracks, Portman Square Barracks, was built between Portman and Orchard Streets; it was demolished in about 1860.

At the east end of the garden, thus marking one end of Baker Street and of Orchard Street (a short link to Oxford Street) is the Hamilton Memorial Drinking fountain. This was provided by Mariana Augusta, under the auspices of the Metropolitan Drinking Fountain and Cattle Trough Association, in honour of her late husband Sir John James Hamilton, 2nd Baronet, briefly MP for Sudbury. The fountain is statutorily protected and recognised in the mainstream, initial category (Grade II).

Notable residents
Its houses were in its first century let or rented in toto by Alexander Hamilton, 10th Duke of Hamilton, Sir Brook Bridges, 3rd Baronet, Henry Pelham-Clinton, 4th Duke of Newcastle-under-Lyne, George Keppel, 6th Earl of Albemarle, Sir Charles Asgill, 1st Baronet, and William Henry Percy. Alexander Duff, 1st Duke of Fife, maintained his London home at No. 15.

Notable houses
About a third of the north side is in the statutory category scheme, described above but in the rarest, highest category, Grade I.

No.s 11–15 built in 1773–1776 by architect James Wyatt in cooperation with his brother Samuel Wyatt. First houses in which Coade stone was used. Demolished in the 20th century.
No. 20 – Home House, built by Robert Adam between 1773 and 1777 for Elizabeth, Countess of Home, and later used by the Courtauld Institute.
No. 22 – Montagu House, built in the northwest corner of the square by James Stuart between 1777 and 1781 for Elizabeth Montagu, demolished in the Blitz by an incendiary bomb.
No. 30 – Churchill Hotel, incorporating the Michelin-starred Locanda Locatelli restaurant. This was bought on a long lease as home of George Keppel, grandson of George Keppel, 6th Earl of Albemarle (noted above), and the husband of Alice Keppel, the mistress of King Edward VII.

Gallery

See also
 List of eponymous roads in London

References

External links

Portman Square at londontown.com
Portman Square at marylebonevillage.com
www.georgianindex.net (via web.archive.org)

Squares in the City of Westminster
Portman estate
1784 establishments in Great Britain
Communal gardens